Translation initiation factor eIF-2B subunit alpha is a protein that in humans is encoded by the EIF2B1 gene.

Interactions 
EIF2B1 has been shown to interact with EIF2B5.

References

Further reading